Nyasha Hatendi (born 14 September 1981) is a Zimbabwean-British-American actor, director, writer and producer.

Early life and education 
Hatendi was born on 14 September 1981 in Washington, D.C. Hatendi grew up in three countries: the United States, the United Kingdom and Zimbabwe before attending the Royal Academy of Dramatic Arts in London.

Filmography

Films

Television

Video games

Radio

Performances

Theatre

Awards and nominations

See also 

 List of African-American actors

References

External links 
 
 
 
 

1981 births
Living people
People from Washington, D.C.
Male actors from Washington, D.C.
Alumni of Peterhouse Boys' School
People educated at Eton College
Alumni of RADA
21st-century American male actors
American male film actors
American male stage actors
American male television actors
American male voice actors
American male radio actors
American film producers
American people of Zimbabwean descent
Shona people
African-American male actors
21st-century African-American people
20th-century African-American people